Haplochromis guiarti is a species of cichlid endemic to Lake Victoria though it may now be extinct.  This species can reach a length of  SL. The specific name honours the French parasitologist Jules Guiart (1870-1965), who was a friend of Jacques Pellegrin's.

References

guiarti
Fish of Tanzania
Fish of Lake Victoria
Fish described in 1904
Taxonomy articles created by Polbot